Tom Owen is a historian and Democratic politician in Louisville, Kentucky, former Metro Council President, and former councilman for District 8, a position he held from 2002-2016. Prior to that, he had served on the old Board of Aldermen from 1990 to 1998. He is a full professor at the University of Louisville, and has worked at the school since 1968. He holds a Ph.D. in American History from the University of Kentucky and a bachelor of divinity from Methodist Theological School in Ohio. He and his wife, Phyllis, have a daughter, two sons and seven grandchildren.

He challenged eventual mayor David L. Armstrong in the 1998 Democratic mayoral primary.

Owen grew up in the Parkland neighborhood and lives in the Tyler Park area. He was once a practicing Methodist minister. He is a local historian and activist, particularly with causes related to alternative transportation, and is known for advocating and practicing use of the bicycle for transportation and commuting. He also leads historic tours of Louisville landmarks, called Tom Owen's Louisville.

References

Year of birth missing (living people)
Living people
Louisville Metro Council members
Kentucky Democrats
University of Louisville faculty
University of Kentucky alumni
21st-century American politicians